Čapljina is a city located in Herzegovina-Neretva Canton of the Federation of Bosnia and Herzegovina, an entity of Bosnia and Herzegovina. It is located on the border with Croatia a mere  from the Adriatic Sea.

The river Neretva flows through the city and flows into the Adriatic just over the border. The town's landmark is a statue of King Tomislav. The Church of Saint Francis of Assisi is also a prominent facet of the city. The city coat of arms contains the Croatian checkerboard, the nearby tower in Počitelj, and Saint Francis of Assisi.

The city has a rich archaeological history and untouched wilderness and is starting to develop agricultural tourism. It is also home to Hutovo Blato Park, which contains one of the most diverse bird populations in all Europe. The Croatian town of Metković is located just over the border and there are significant commercial and other links between the two towns new Čapljina International Speedway.

History

Not much is known about this city but it was founded by Romans in 5 BC. However, ancient Greek, and later Roman maps clearly show that the area was populated by several native Illyrian peoples, including the Ardiaei, whom the ancient geographer Strabo lists as one of the three strongest Illyrian peoples – the other two being the Autariatae and the Dardani.

Čapljina is situated in the wider Neretva valley region (the original homeland of ancient Illyrian people of Ardiaei), and its name derives from čaplja which means 'heron'. The Latin word for heron is ardea, a word that bears striking similarity with the name of Ardiaei, and it might possibly be its cognate. This theory opens up many possibilities for the interpretation of the original homeland of the Ardiaei and the etymology of their name. For example, heron might have had totemic pagan value among local Illyrians, due to its presence in this area, and it is not implausible to conclude that one of those Illyrian peoples named itself after a heron, the Ardiaei.

The Latin word ardea might be a Latin translation of some original Illyrian word for 'heron' that Romans found when they settled in this area, or the 'ardea' itself, could have been an Illyrian word taken by Romans, who might have slightly altered it and integrated it into their language, the Latin. Indeed, the word Ardiaei is found in ancient Greek sources predating the arrival of Romans and their language to the Illyrian lands. It is also possible that ancient Illyrians or Romans named this place 'the place of heron(s), and the Slavic settlers, who settled in the former Illyrian lands around 6th century A.D. translated the name of this place into their language(s), which in turn gave 'Čapljina', "the place of heron(s)".

The Prebilovci massacre, in which around 4,000 people (mainly Serbs) were killed total, including 300 villagers from the Prebilovci thrown into a pit, is one of the most significant atrocities in this area during the Genocide of Serbs in the Independent State of Croatia. Out of about 700 villagers from Prebilovci, fewer than 200 survived. As a revenge, In 1942, the Serbian royalist Chetniks attacked several villages in the Čapljina area. The village of Hotanj was burned, and many Croat and Bosniak civilians were killed. The massacres were a part of the Chetnik genocidal campaign against non-Serbs.

Since World War II it has been an important road and rail transportation link, connecting the rest of Bosnia and Herzegovina with the port of Ploče in Croatia. During the 1992–1995 war in Bosnia and Herzegovina the city was taken over by the Croatian Defence Council, which expelled the non-Croat population and set up concentration camps for Bosniaks at Gabela camp and Dretelj camp.

During the summer of 2007 wildfires caused extensive damage throughout the rural part of the municipality. The officials of Čapljina, Stolac, Čitluk and Neum declared the state of natural disaster on their territories.

Status

In May 2019, the Municipality of Čapljina became an official city.

Settlements

Demographics

Population

Ethnic composition

Culture
In the Čapljina area, cultural associations include the following:
 HKUD Čapljina
 HKUD Sveti Ante (Dretelj)
 HKUD Seljačka Sloga (Trebižat)
 HKUD "Zora" Struge-Gorica
 KUD "Kolo Dubravsko" (Bivolje Brdo)

Notable residents

Dejan Aćimović (born 1963), Croatian actor
Dragan Bender (born 1997), Croatian basketball player in the Israeli Basketball Premier League
Milorad Ekmečić (1928–2015), Serbian historian
Mirsad Fazlagić (born 1943), retired Yugoslav footballer
Nikica Jelavić (born 1985), Croatian footballer
Vukašin Mandrapa (? - 1943), Serbian Orthodox saint
Semjon Milošević (born 1979), retired footballer
Slobodan Praljak (1945–2017), Croatian general, politician, and writer
Admir Salihović (born 1988), Bosnian footballer
Ivo Prskalo (born 1948), retired Yugoslav and Australian footballer
Dada Vujasinović (1964–1994), Serbian journalist and news reporter
Jasmin Repeša (born 1961), Croatian basketball coach
Pamela Ramljak (born 1979), Croatian singer
Marko Vego (1907–1985), Yugoslav archeologist, epigrapher and historian
Nikola Prce (born 1980), Bosnian handball player

Sports
 HNK Čapljina (football)
 GOŠK Gabela (football)
 HKK Čapljina Lasta (basketball)

Twin towns – sister cities

Čapljina is twinned with:
 Koprivnica, Croatia
 Požega, Croatia
 Vrhnika, Slovenia

References

Bibliography

External links 

 
Populated places in Čapljina
Cities and towns in the Federation of Bosnia and Herzegovina